Ipiatik Lake is a lake in Alberta, Canada.

Ipiatik is a name derived from the Cree language meaning "look out".

See also
List of lakes of Alberta

References

Lakes of Alberta